= Physically unable to perform =

NFL roster designation

Physically unable to perform (PUP) is a roster designation used in the National Football League (NFL) for players who suffered injuries during football-related activities prior to the start of training camp. Players on the PUP list may participate in team meetings, and use team training and medical facilities, but cannot practice with their team. There are two separate PUP lists: an active PUP list used prior to the start of the regular season, and a reserve PUP list used during the regular season.

== Active/PUP ==
A player who, as a result of football-related injuries, is unable to take part in training camp practices may be assigned to the active/PUP list at the start of camp. Players can be moved off the PUP list to the active roster at any time prior to the start of the regular season, even after one practice. A player cannot be placed on the PUP list, however, once he has taken the field for a practice or game.

== Reserve/PUP ==
A player who finishes the preseason still on the PUP list can then be moved to the reserve/PUP list. Such players must sit out the first four weeks of the regular season. At that point, teams have a five-week window in which to allow the player to begin practicing; from the day the player begins practicing, teams have an additional 21-day window in which to decide whether to activate the player to the 53-man roster. If either of those deadlines passes, the player must remain on the PUP list for the remainder of the season.

== See also ==
- Injured reserve list
- Non-football injury and illness
